Ann Murdock (born Irene Anna Coleman; November 10, 1890 – April 22, 1939) was a stage and silent film actress popular during the 1910s. She was sometimes billed as Anna Murdock.

Career 
Murdock debuted on stage in The Lion and the Mouse in 1908 in Pittsburgh. She also appeared in The Offenders in New York in 1908. Her Broadway debut came in The Noble Spaniard (1909), and her final Broadway appearance was in The Three Bears (1917).

Personal life
Murdock's private life became public upon the death of Alf Hayman in 1921. Hayman had headed the Frohman theatrical operations after the death of Charles Frohman. When Hayman's will became public, it revealed that the bulk of his multimillion-dollar estate went to Murdock, with no bequests to his wife or his sisters. Hayman's widow expressed no desire to contest the will.

On August 4, 1924, Murdock married Harry Carson Powers in Baltimore, Maryland. They were divorced in Paris on December 13, 1926. Murdock married Hallam Keep Williams on August 28, 1928, in Rye, New York. In May 1929, she sought a divorce from him. On October 14, 1931, she married hotel manager Cavaliere Leone Calleoni in Milan, Italy.

Filmography
 A Royal Family (1915)
 Captain Jinks of the Horse Marines (1916)
 The Seven Deadly Sins (1917)
 Envy (1917)
 Where Love Is (1917)
 The Seventh Sin (1917)
 Outcast (1917)
 The Beautiful Adventure (1917)
 Please Help Emily (1917)
 The Impostor (1918)
 My Wife (1918)
 The Richest Girl (1918)

Gallery

References

External links

gallery of Ann Murdock photos (NY Public Library Billy Rose collection)
portrait gallery(University of Washington, Sayre)
 color portrait(Library of Congress)
Ann Murdock, color portrait(Library of Congress)
autochrome portrait by Arnold Genthe of Ann Murdock with Genthe's cat Buzzer
findagrave.com

1890 births
1939 deaths
American stage actresses
American silent film actresses
Actresses from New York (state)
People from Long Island
20th-century American actresses
People from Port Washington, New York